
Jarocin County is a unit of territorial administration and local government (powiat) in Greater Poland Voivodeship, west-central Poland. It came into being on January 1, 1999, as a result of the Polish local government reforms passed in 1998.

As of 2006 its total population is 70,390, out of which the population of Jarocin is 25,834, that of Żerków is 2,058, and the rural population is 42,498.

Neighbouring counties
Jarocin County is bordered by Środa Wielkopolska County and Września County to the north, Pleszew County to the east, Krotoszyn County to the south, and Gostyń County and Śrem County to the west.

Administrative division
The county is subdivided into four gminas (two urban-rural and two rural). These are listed in the following table, in descending order of population.

References
Polish official population figures 2006

 
Jarocin